Bouhy is a commune in the Nièvre department in central France, in the natural region of Forterre.

Population

See also
Communes of the Nièvre department

References

Communes of Nièvre